Louis Mountbatten, 1st Earl Mountbatten of Burma, a relative of the British royal family, was assassinated on 27 August 1979 by Thomas McMahon, an Irish republican and volunteer for the Provisional Irish Republican Army (IRA). 

McMahon placed a bomb on Mountbatten's boat while it was harboured overnight in Mullaghmore Peninsula in County Sligo, Republic of Ireland. It was detonated several hours later, after Mountbatten and his family and crew had boarded it and taken it offshore. Mountbatten was found alive by fishermen who rushed to the site of the explosion, but died before reaching shore. Also killed were Mountbatten's young grandson Nicholas Knatchbull, and Paul Maxwell, a boy from Enniskillen serving as crew. The four others aboardMountbatten's daughter Patricia; her husband John Knatchbull; their son Timothy; and John Knatchbull's mother Doreenwere all seriously injured. Doreen Knatchbull died the following day.

The assassination took place during The Troubles, a conflict between republicans and unionists in Northern Ireland following the Partition of Ireland. The IRA claimed responsibility three days after the bombing, describing the attack as "a discriminate act to bring to the attention of the English people the continuing occupation of our country."

Mountbatten was a great-grandson of Queen Victoria, second cousin to Queen Elizabeth II, and uncle to her husband Prince Philip, Duke of Edinburgh. As Chief of the Defence Staff, Mountbatten served as head of the British Armed Forces from 1959 to 1965, having previously headed the Royal Navy as the First Sea Lord. 
Sinn Féin vice-president Gerry Adams said that Mountbatten was a military target in a war situation.

Two hours before the explosion, McMahon had been arrested by the Garda Síochána (Irish police) on suspicion of driving a stolen vehicle. Paint from Mountbatten's boat, and traces of nitroglycerine, were found on his clothes, and on 23 November 1979 he was convicted of the killings in the Republic of Ireland. His sentence was life imprisonment.

The assassination marked an escalation of the conflict, with the IRA committing their deadliest attack on the British Army (the Warrenpoint ambush) on the same day as the assassination. Thatcher changed Britain's approach by treating IRA prisoners as criminals rather than prisoners of war and was herself the target of an assassination attempt five years later.<ref>Lord Mountbatten’s assassination and its impact on IRA’s push for independence. Indian Express (2020-11-18). Retrieved 2022-07-20.</ref> McMahon was released in 1998 under the terms of the Good Friday Agreement, as part of the Northern Ireland peace process which brought an end to the Troubles.

Reactions
The killing was condemned by UK Prime Minister Margaret Thatcher and Irish Taoiseach Jack Lynch. Many international figures offered their condolences to the royal family, including US President Jimmy Carter and Pope John Paul II.Death of Mountbatten: Taoiseach John Lynch message to MT (condolences and condemnation). Margaret Thatcher.org. Retrieved 2022-07-20. Three days of state mourning was announced in Burma (Myanmar), while in India where he served as the last Viceroy and first Governor-General, a week of mourning was observed. The Gazette of India published an extraordinary obituary notice, the All India Radio broadcast a short tribute including statements by former Prime Minister of India Indira Gandhi who called him "an extraordinary personality, a lion, a born leader of men", Tribute to Lord Mountbatten'', a television special on DD National was broadcast, led by Prime Minister Charan Singh; it included Indira Gandhi and other Indian leaders. Singh also signed the condolence book at the British High Commission, New Delhi. Providing condolences, the President of India Neelam Sanjiva Reddy said in a message to Queen Elizabeth II "Lord Mountbatten will always occupy a place of honor in India."

References

Assassinations in Ireland
1979 in the Republic of Ireland
The Troubles (Northern Ireland)
Terrorist incidents in the 1970s
Improvised explosive device bombings in Europe
1979 murders in Europe
County Sligo
August 1979 events
1979 crimes in the Republic of Ireland
1979 murders in the Republic of Ireland